Frontier Woman is a 1956 American Western film directed by Ron Ormond starring Cindy Carson, Lance Fuller and Ann Kelly. It was Ron Howard's  film debut.

Plot

Cast
 Cindy Carson as Polly
 Lance Fuller as Catwampus Jones
 Ann Kelly as Rosebud
 James Clayton as Neshoba
 Rance Howard as Prewitt

Production
The film was the second from Panorama Pictures. It was filmed on the Chunky River in Mississippi.

External links

References

1956 Western (genre) films
1956 films
American Western (genre) films
1950s English-language films
1950s American films